The West Montgomery Avenue Historic District is a national historic district located at Rockville, Montgomery County, Maryland. It is a residential area with single-family homes predominating. The majority of the properties within the district date from the 1880s, with a few older homes and somewhat more from later periods. The predominant character of the district is set by the rows of Victorian houses built between 1880 and 1900 in a vernacular residential mode with Eastlake and Stick Style influences. Also included in the district are attorneys' offices; churches and parsonages; a funeral home; the former Woodlawn Hotel, later called the Chestnut Lodge Sanitarium (destroyed by fire, June 7, 2009); and the headquarters of the Montgomery County Historical Society.

It was listed on the National Register of Historic Places in 1975.

Gallery

References

External links
, including photo in 2003, at Maryland Historical Trust website
Boundary Map of the West Montgomery Avenue Historic District, Montgomery County, at Maryland Historical Trust

Historic districts on the National Register of Historic Places in Maryland
Historic districts in Montgomery County, Maryland
Rockville, Maryland
National Register of Historic Places in Montgomery County, Maryland